Presidential Guard Regiment was a military unit stationed in Çankaya Köşkü, the official residence of the Prime Minister of Turkey (office abolished in 2018) and until 2014 the official residence of the President of Turkey. The Guard Regiment was the only unit in the Land Forces of Turkish Armed Forces to wear turquoise and white ceremonial uniforms.

History
The Turkish Presidential Guard Regiment was established in July 1920 under President Atatürk. Its original role was to provide security in Ankara, in what was then a small and isolated city. As a battalion sized unit it saw active service during the war with Greece.

In 1927 the Guard Battalion, as it was then known, was expanded to 2,500 men and renamed as the Presidential Guards Regiment. During World War II the unit was expanded again and restructured as a brigade and then a division. In 1948 it was reduced to battalion strength and in 1953 merged with the separate Parliamentary Guard Battalion, under its final title of Presidential Guard Regiment.

Primarily visible as a ceremonial and honor guard unit, the regiment included a horse mounted escort. Under President Erdoğan during 2015 the Guard provided small detachments in various historic Ottoman costumes at public functions.

Following the abortive coup attempt of 2016, almost 300 members of this unit were arrested. Shortly thereafter, the Turkish government announced that the entire Presidential Guard Regiment was to be disbanded. Though plans for full disbandment were subsequently abandoned, the Presidential Guard was reorganised and its ceremonial responsibility for the protection of the presidential palace was handed over to a special police operations unit.

Commanders

References 

Guards of honour
Military units and formations of Turkey
Presidents of Turkey
Military units and formations established in 1920